Manipuri Vaishnavism, also known as Meitei Vaishnavism, is a regional variant of Gaudiya Vaishnavism with a culture-forming role in the north-eastern Indian state of Manipur. 

The Manipuri Vaishnavas do not worship Krishna alone, but as Radha-Krishna. With the spread of Vaishnavism the worship of Krishna and Radha became the dominant form in the Manipur region. Every village there has a Thakur-ghat and a temple.

Background
Vaishnavism in Manipur has extended history. While there are records in the Puranas as to account of the pre-historic forms of Vaishnavism or Bhagavatism in the area of present state, the modern history of Vaishnava practices in Manipur started with a king of the Shan kingdom of Pong gifting a murti of Vishnu chakra (the symbolic disc of Vishnu or Krishna) to Kyamaba, king of Manipur, so since the 1470s the kings of Manipur started worshiping Vishnu. Many brahmana priests from the west, main areas of India, came to Manipur and settled there. The account of the arrival of the members of brahmanas is found in the records of the book Bamon Khunthock. King Kyamba (1467–1523) built a Vishnu mandir in Vishnupur, a notable architectural monument. In 1704 King Charai Rongba was initiated into Vaishnava tradition and since then Vaishnavism became the state religion. This consolidated the cultural contact with India even further. After a short period of Vaishnavite Ramaism penetration, Gaudiya Vaishnavism spread in the early 18th century, especially from beginning its second quarter. King Gharib Nawaz (Pamheiba) was ruling from 1709 to 1748 and he was initiated into Vaishnavism of Gaudiya Chaitanya tradition, by followers of Narottama Dasa Thakura. He practiced this religion for nearly twenty years. Preachers and pilgrims used to arrive in large numbers and cultural contact with Assam was maintained. It is believed that the wave of devotion that turned the entire kingdom Krishna conscious took place during the reign of Gharib Nawaz’s grandson Bhagyachandra.

King Bhagyachandra
King Ching-Thang Khomba, also known as Rajarishi Bhagyachandra, was most devoted ruler and propagandist of Gaudiya Vaishnavism, under the influence of Narottama Dasa Thakura's disciples, and who has visited the holy for the Chaytanyaits Nabadwip. He ascended the throne in 1759; however, in 1762 the Burmese invaded Manipur, and the king, with his queen and a few attendants, fled to the neighboring state, now known as Assam. The dispute over real identity of the king, called for a demonstration of supernatural powers, believed to be attributed to the king. It is believed that Bhagyachandra had a revelation from Lord Krishna in a dream; based on this revelation, he committed himself to making worship of Govinda the state religion on return to power in Manipur. It is believed that the murti of Govinda was to be made of the specific sacred tree and carefully planned Rasa-lila dances to be instituted in the country, which was regained with the help of the king of present-day Assam. On reinstating the throne, a Govinda idol was installed and regularly worshiped; later a Radha idol was installed and worshiped next to it.

Impact of Gaudiya Vaishnavism

The Meiteis or Manipuris were initiated to the religion of Chaitanya during the middle of the 18th century. With a vast cultural changes during the then king Bhangyachandra, which include development of raslila dance drama of Manipuri Raas Leela dedicated to ras of Krishna and gopis, which is well known to the world, the image of Manipuri society changed and evolved as a sanskritised society.
Various other literature of gaudiya sampradaya was translated and thoroughly studied. This also included chantings and sankirtana. Various other dance drama were also composed like gaura lila and six form of ras lila and performed in villages of Manipur. 
The manipuri ras lila dance is evolved from dances of lai haraoba performed by maiba and maibi,priests and priestesses of traditional meitei religious beliefs  before vaishnavism in manipur. Rasa Lila and Manipuri Sankirtana or Nata Sankirtana which is also a UNESCO Intangible Cultural Heritage of Humanity, became the important features of day to day life. In all rituals non-vegetarian foods is completely prohibited.

Even though, Krishnaism became a prominent part of meitei religious beliefs, they never stopped worshipping the traditional deities. So, one cannot deny that Meitei religious world is an amalgamation of two religious beliefs. The older deities with similar concepts were equated with different other hindu gods, like Lainingthou Nongpok Ningthou and Panthoibi with Shiv-Parvati, etc. There are many temples in Imphal valley like Hiyangthang Lairembi where the deity is worshipped in both Sanamahism and vaishnavism way. The advent of Vaishnavism had added various aesthetic element to the existing cultural beauty of the Manipur. The creativity and devotional spirit of meitei has indeed given a lot of internationally recognized elements like Manipuri dance and Nat Sankirtana to art and culture of Vaishnav world.

See also
Chaitanya Mahaprabhu
Bhaktisvarupa Damodara Swami
Manipuri dance

Notes

References

Bibliography

External links

Culture of Manipur
Gaudiya Vaishnavism
Krishnaite Vaishnava denominations
Meitei culture